The Sierra Nevada de Santa Marta (English: Snow-Covered Mountain Range of Saint Martha) is an isolated mountain range in northern Colombia, separate from the Andes range that runs through the north of the country. Reaching an elevation of  just  from the Caribbean coast, the Sierra Nevada is the highest coastal range in the tropics, and one of the highest coastal ranges in the world, being  shorter than the Saint Elias Mountains in Canada. The range is in the Departments of Magdalena, Cesar and La Guajira.

The highest point of the Sierra Nevada group (and Colombia in general) may be either Pico Cristóbal Colón or Pico Simón Bolívar, both in the municipalities of Santa Marta and Aracataca; it has yet to be determined which is higher.

The Sierra Nevada is a compact group, relatively small in area, and completely surrounded by lands with elevations below . Although it is associated with the Tropical Andes, the main backbone of the Andes cannot be reached from the Sierra Nevada without dropping below this level. This makes its highest point the world's fifth most prominent summit.

Several peaks in the Sierra Nevada are intervisible with Cerro Paramillo, a  peak  in Antioquia Department.

Climate

Biodiversity
There is a great variety and large populations of epiphytes and lianas, and more than 3,000 species of vascular plants are found in the area. The indigenous peoples made an alcoholic beverage from fruits of the palm Attalea maripa found at the lower elevations.

Of Colombia's 340 endemic species, 44 are found in the park, for example seven species of endemic hummingbirds. Of the 3,057 endangered species, 44 are found here. The area is home to 440 species of birds, including black-fronted wood-quail, king vulture, Andean condor, Santa Marta warbler and Santa Marta parakeet. Mammals found in the park include: tapir, cougar, jaguar, squirrel, Transandinomys talamancae, otter, and brocket deer.

The Sierra Nevada de Santa Marta is home to a number of ecoregions, which vary with elevation.

The Guajira–Barranquilla xeric scrub region lies near the Caribbean seacoast to the north of the range.

The Santa Marta montane forests lie above . The montane forests are separated from other moist forests by the lower-elevation dry forests and xeric shrublands, and have large numbers of endemic species. Above  is a transitional forest zone of smaller trees and palms.

The Santa Marta Páramo is the northernmost enclave of Páramo in South America, which occur along the Andes belt. Above  lies the permanent snow cap.

National Natural Park
The Sierra Nevada de Santa Marta National Natural Park is Colombia's second oldest national park, established in 1964. It is located in the Cordillera Oriental range, between the departments of La Guajira, Magdalena and Cesar, in the mountain range of the Sierra Nevada de Santa Marta. It is a sanctuary as well as a tourist attraction, because it offers different climate, terrain, flora and fauna environments, ranging from beaches to snowy mountain peaks.

All the water courses that originate in the national park drain to the Caribbean sea whether directly (e. g. rivers Ranchería, Don Diego, Palomino, Buritaca, Guachaca, Cañas, etc.) or through the Magdalena River system that includes the Ciénaga Grande de Santa Marta, (e.g. rivers Cesar, Ariguaní, Fundación, Frío, Aracataca, etc.). Roughly 1.2 million people are dependent upon the freshwater supplied by the Sierra Nevada de Santa Marta rivers. There are currently about 30,000 indigenous people of the ethnic groups Koguis, Arhuacos, Kankuamos and Wiwa living in the area. This park is also home to the remnants of the Tairona Culture. In 1979, the park was designated a Biosphere reserve by UNESCO.
A 2013 report by the International Union for Conservation of Nature on the world's most irreplaceable protected areas identified the park as the most irreplaceable park in the world for threatened species.

Geology
It is composed of Cretaceous metamorphic rocks (predominantly schists and gneisses) and quartzdioritic intrusives of Tertiary age. The Quaternary of the Sierra Nevada de Santa Marta is mainly represented by colluvial-alluvial valley fill and by recent beach deposits. The coastlines of the northwestern part of the Sierra Nevada de Santa Marta are indented, reflecting the alternation of rocky headlands and deep, north-northwest trending tectonically controlled bays. The headlands are typically  cliffs cut into schists and granites, whereas the embayments front alluvial valley deposits. The bay shores are typically steep, reflective beaches composed of very coarse sand to granules eroded from adjacent cliffs and alluvial deposits. Wide pocket beaches and tombolos are common along sectors with abundant rocky erosional remnants and stacks.

Fauna
Three species of reptiles which are native to the Sierra Nevada de Santa Marta are named after it: Anolis santamartae, a lizard; Atractus sanctaemartae, a snake; and Lepidoblepharis sanctaemartae, a lizard.

The range is home to about 20 endemic bird species.

Inhabitants
The Sierra Nevada de Santa Marta is home to the remnants of the Native American Tairona Culture; Arhuacos, Koguis, Wiwas and Kankuamos, that live in Resguardos Indigenas (indigenous reserves) located in the mid-highlands.

Recent access problems
For the last ten years, access to the highest summits has been very difficult, and this situation continues,  although there is a documented ascent of Pico Cristóbal Colón in December 2015. This was due to opposition from locals in the southern side of the mountain to aid and allow climbers to explore the place. Their aid and permission is important for success in the summit. Armed turmoil has also proven to hinder access to the place, notwithstanding the peace process carried on since 2016.

See also

Ciudad Perdida
Tayrona
Juan Mayr
Pico Cristobal Colon
Pico Simon Bolivar

References

External links
http://www.colombia.com/colombiainfo/parquesnaturales/sierranevada.asp

Case study by Fundación Pró-Sierra Nevada de Santa Marta
The Guardian.com: "The Lure of Colombia's Lost City" (2009)]
Royal Geography Society − Hidden Journeys project: "Sierra Nevada de Santa Marta − Sampling the food cultures of northern Colombia with hungry cyclist Tom Kevill-Davies" — audio slideshow.

 
Santa Marta
National parks of Colombia
Geography of Cesar Department
Geography of La Guajira Department
Geography of Magdalena Department
Sierra Nevada de Santa Marta
Biosphere reserves of Colombia
Protected areas established in 1964
1964 establishments in Colombia
Ecoregions of Colombia
Páramos
Tourist attractions in Cesar Department
Tourist attractions in La Guajira Department
Tourist attractions in Magdalena Department
Magdalena River
World Heritage Tentative List for Colombia